A. vicina may refer to:

 Agave vicina, a plant species in the genus Agave
 Amphiodia vicina, a brittle star species in the genus Amphiodia

See also
 Vicina (disambiguation)